Boris Kaelin Byrd (born April 15, 1962 in Warren County, Kentucky) is a former American football defensive back in the National Football League (NFL). He played in 3 games for the New York Giants in the 1987 NFL season. He played college football at Austin Peay State.

References 
Boris Byrd's stats

1962 births
Living people
People from Warren County, Kentucky
American football defensive backs
New York Giants players